Sri Lanka is home to 245 species of butterflies with 23 of these being endemic to the island. Of the 245 species, 76, are listed as threatened nationally, while Ceylon Rose is designated as critically endangered.

General description

The majority of species are found in the foothills (up to  elevation). A much smaller number of species are found above , while 20 species of butterfly are restricted to the low lying dry zone (below  elevation). The number of butterflies peaks in two seasons during the year. The first of these is during the Southwestern monsoon in the months of March to April. The second is during the Northeastern monsoon which continues from September to October.

Within Sri Lanka, the latest revision of lepidopterans described 1903 species with 58 families of butterflies and moths. Out of these 1903 species, 208 species are butterflies and 1695 species are moths. 

The family-wise number of butterfly species are :

History of studies on butterflies
The first studies of Ceylon butterflies were published by James Emerson Tennent in Ceylon, Physical, Historical and Topographical based on work by Robert Templeton and Edgar Leopold Layard active in the 1840s. In these early years William de Alwis made watercolour illustrations of life histories. Later in the century this was followed by The Lepidoptera of Ceylon by Frederic Moore which was published in 1880. Pioneering studies based on field observations were published by Walter Ormiston,a tea planter from Kalupahani, Haldumille,  in 1924, Lionel Gilbert Ollyet Woodhouse and Henry in 1942 and by Woodhouse again in 1950. Bernard d'Abrera published The butterflies of Ceylon in 1998 based on examination of specimens in the Natural History Museum in London. Recently, papers have been published on status of particular butterfly families, check-lists of various localities, life-cycles and natural history as well as butterfly migration.

New species
In 2008, Dr. Michael van der Poorten discovered a new species of Sri Lankan butterfly, the first such discovery in 60 years. The species has been identified as Catopsilia scylla.

Conservation
Habitat destruction and degradation, air pollution, over-usage of pesticides, and over-exploitation for ornamental trade are the main threats to butterflies in Sri Lanka. Prolonged droughts and over-predation also pose a threat to them. Opportunistic predators such as ants and birds prey on butterfly eggs, caterpillars, pupae and adult individuals. The Ceylon Rose and Ceylon Birdwing species are presently included in the appendices of the Convention on International Trade in Endangered Species of Wild Fauna and Flora (CITES). This United Nations initiative aims to protect these species against over-exploitation by restricting trade across borders.

Endemic species

A majority of endemic species are restricted to the wet zone forests. The Ceylon Birdwing is one of the largest endemics of the country and is found in large numbers in the Sinharaja Forest Reserve. 

source: srilankaninsects.net

See also
Harish Gaonkar

References

Channa N.B. Bambaradeniya E. 2006. The fauna of Sri Lanka : status of taxonomy, research, and conservation Colombo, The World Conservation Union (IUCN) 
D'Abrera, B.L. (1998) The Butterflies of Ceylon. Hill House: Melbourne; London. 224pp. 
Henry, G. M. R., Woodhouse, L. G. O. (1942) The Butterfly Fauna of Ceylon. Colombo ; Ceylon. 153pp.
Moore, F. C. (1880–87) The Lepidoptera of Ceylon. L. Reeve & Co. : London. 3 v.
Ormiston, W. (1924) The butterflies of Ceylon Colombo, H. W. Cave
Pethiyagoda, R. (1998) The family de Alwis Seneviratne of Sri Lanka: pioneers in biological illustration. Journal of South Asian natural history. Vol.4, pp. 99–110.